Giorgio Ravalli (20 May 1925 – 27 October 2001) was an Italian field hockey player. He competed in the men's tournament at the 1952 Summer Olympics.

References

External links
 

1925 births
2001 deaths
Italian male field hockey players
Olympic field hockey players of Italy
Field hockey players at the 1952 Summer Olympics
Place of birth missing